
Gmina Borowie is a rural gmina (administrative district) in Garwolin County, Masovian Voivodeship, in east-central Poland.

Villages
Gmina Borowie contains the villages and settlements of Borowie, Brzuskowola, Chromin, Dudka, Filipówka, Głosków, Gościewicz, Gózd, Iwowe, Jaźwiny, Kamionka, Laliny, Łętów, Łopacianka, Nowa Brzuza, Słup Drugi, Słup Pierwszy, Stara Brzuza and Wilchta.

Neighbouring gminas
Gmina Borowie is bordered by the gminas of Garwolin, Górzno, Latowicz, Miastków Kościelny, Parysów, Stoczek Łukowski and Wodynie.

References
Polish official population figures 2006

Borowie
Garwolin County